Nelson Gonçalves (June 21, 1919 – April 18, 1998) was a Brazilian singer and songwriter.

Born Antônio Gonçalves Sobral in Santana do Livramento, Rio Grande do Sul, he was raised in São Paulo. As a young man, he worked at a variety of menial jobs, including boxing, before embarking on a career in music that saw him become one of the most popular Brazilian radio singers of the 1950s.

Nelson Gonçalves had a very productive collaboration with lyricist Adelino Moreira and recorded numerous successful albums. One of the great crooners of the day, he gained an international following and appeared at venues such as Radio City Music Hall in New York City. Nelson sold more than 62 million albums around the globe and is the second best-selling Brazilian artist of all time, behind Roberto Carlos (77 million).

His personal life was sometimes filled with turmoil, and at one time, a cocaine addiction almost destroyed his career. Despite having an outstanding singing voice, he was known to have a stutter in his regular speech.

Nelson Gonçalves died of a heart attack at the age of 79.

On his passing, Nelson Gonçalves was buried at Cemitério São João Batista in Rio de Janeiro.

In 2001, director Elizeu Ewald filmed a docu-drama about his life.

References

1919 births
1998 deaths
People from Rio Grande do Sul
20th-century Brazilian male singers
20th-century Brazilian singers
Brazilian people of Portuguese descent
Burials at Cemitério de São João Batista